This is an index of articles related to Asia:

By country
 Index of Abkhazia-related articles
 Index of Armenia-related articles
 Index of Azerbaijan-related articles
 Index of Bahrain-related articles
 Index of Bangladesh-related articles
 Index of Bhutan-related articles
 Index of Brunei-related articles
 Index of Cambodia-related articles
 Index of Christmas Island–related articles
 Index of Cocos (Keeling) Islands-related articles
 Index of Cyprus-related articles
 Index of East Timor-related articles
 Index of Georgia (country)-related articles
 Index of Hong Kong-related articles
 Index of Indonesia-related articles
 Index of Iran-related articles
 Index of Israel-related articles
 Index of Japan-related articles
 Index of Jordan-related articles
 Index of Kazakhstan-related articles
 Index of Kuwait-related articles
 Index of Kyrgyzstan-related articles
 Index of Laos-related articles
 Index of Macau-related articles
 Index of Malaysia-related articles
 Index of Maldives-related articles
 Index of Mongolia-related articles
 Index of Nagorno-Karabakh-related articles
 Index of Nepal-related articles
 Index of Oman-related articles
 Index of Philippines-related articles
 Index of Qatar-related articles
 Index of Russia-related articles (the following parts of Russia are in Asia: Chechnya, Ingushetia, Dagestan, Adyghea, Kabardino-Balkaria, Karachay–Cherkessia, North Ossetia, Krasnodar Krai, Stavropol Krai)
 Index of Saudi Arabia-related articles
 Index of Singapore-related articles
 Index of Syria-related articles
 Index of Taiwan-related articles
 Index of Tibet-related articles
 Index of Turkey-related articles
 Index of Turkmenistan-related articles
 Index of United Arab Emirates-related articles
 Index of Vietnam-related articles
 Index of Yemen-related articles

See also

Country-related topics by country
Asia